Fassler or Fässler is a surname. Notable people with the surname include:

 Ron Fassler (born 1957), American actor and author
 Marcel Fässler (racing driver) (born 1976), Swiss racing driver
 Marcel Fässler (bobsleigh) (born 1959), Swiss bobsledder
 Margot Fassler American music historian